In argumentation theory, an  (Latin for "appeal to the people") is a fallacious argument which is based on claiming a truth or affirming something is good because the majority thinks so.

Alternative names 
Other names for the fallacy include:

Description 
 is a type of informal fallacy, specifically a fallacy of relevance, and is similar to an argument from authority (argumentum ad verecundiam). It uses an appeal to the beliefs, tastes, or values of a group of people, stating that because a certain opinion or attitude is held by a majority, it is therefore correct.

Appeals to popularity are common in commercial advertising that portrays products as desirable because they are used by many people or associated with popular sentiments instead of communicating the merits of the products themselves.

The inverse argument, that something that is unpopular must be flawed, is also a form of this fallacy.

The fallacy is similar in structure to certain other fallacies that involve a confusion between the 'justification' of a belief and its 'widespread acceptance' by a given group of people. When an argument uses the appeal to the beliefs of a group of experts, it takes on the form of an appeal to authority; if the appeal relates to the beliefs of a group of respected elders or the members of one's community over a long time, then it takes on the form of an appeal to tradition. 

One who commits this fallacy may assume that individuals commonly analyze and edit their beliefs and behaviors based on majority opinion. This is often not the case. (See conformity.)

Scholarship 
The philosopher Irving Copi defined  differently from an appeal to popular opinion itself, as an attempt to rouse the "emotions and enthusiasms of the multitude".

Douglas N. Walton argues that appeals to popular opinion can be logically valid in some cases, such as in political dialogue within a democracy.

Reversals

In some circumstances, a person may argue that the fact that Y people believe X to be true implies that X is false. This line of thought is closely related to the appeal to spite fallacy given that it invokes a person's contempt for the general populace or something about the general populace to persuade them that most are wrong about X. This ad populum reversal commits the same logical flaw as the original fallacy given that the idea "X is true" is inherently separate from the idea that "Y people believe X": "Y people believe in X as true, purely because Y people believe in it, and not because of any further considerations. Therefore X must be false." While Y people can believe X to be true for fallacious reasons, X might still be true. Their motivations for believing X do not affect whether X is true or false.

Y=most people, a given quantity of people, people of a particular demographic.

X=a statement that can be true or false.

Examples:
"Are you going to be a mindless conformist drone drinking milk and water like everyone else, or will you wake up and drink my product?"
"Everyone likes The Beatles and that probably means that they didn't have nearly as much talent as <Y band>, which didn't sell out."
"The German people today consists of the Auschwitz generation, with every person in power being guilty in some way. How on earth can we buy the generally held propaganda that the Soviet Union is imperialistic and totalitarian? Clearly, it must not be."
"Everyone loves <A actor>. <A actor> must be nowhere near as talented as the devoted and serious method actors that aren't so popular like <B actor>."

In general, the reversal usually goes: Most people believe A and B are both true. B is false. Thus, A is false. The similar fallacy of chronological snobbery is not to be confused with the ad populum reversal. Chronological snobbery is the claim that if belief in both X and Y was popularly held in the past and if Y was recently proved to be untrue then X must also be untrue. That line of argument is based on a belief in historical progress and not—like the ad populum reversal is—on whether or not X and/or Y is currently popular.

See also

Notes

References

Further reading

External links 
 "Argumentum ad Populum (Appeal to Numbers)", ThoughtCo.
 "Bandwagon Fallacy", Excelsior College Online Writing Lab
 "Philosophy 103: Introduction to Logic: Argumentum Ad Populum", Lander University

Consensus reality
Genetic fallacies
Latin logical phrases
Propaganda techniques
Majority–minority relations